Senator Rice may refer to:

Members of the United States Senate
Benjamin F. Rice (1828–1905), U.S. Senator from Arkansas from 1868 to 1873
Henry Mower Rice (1816–1894), U.S. Senator from Minnesota from 1858 to 1863

United States state senate members
Abbott Barnes Rice (1862–1926), Massachusetts State Senate
Albert E. Rice (1845–1921), Minnesota State Senate
Andrew Rice (born 1973), Oklahoma State Senate
Edmund Rice (politician) (1819–1889), Minnesota State Senate
Frank P. Rice (1838–1923), Georgia State Senate
George Merrick Rice (1808–1894), Massachusetts
Harvey Rice (1800–1891), Ohio State Senate
Jacob Rice (New York politician) (1847–1930), New York State Senate
Jim Rice (Idaho politician) (fl. 2010s), Idaho State Senate
John A. Rice (politician) (1832–?), Wisconsin State Senate
John S. Rice (1899–1985), Pennsylvania State Senate
Ronald Rice (born 1945), New Jersey State Senate
Samuel Farrow Rice (1816–1890), Alabama State Senate
Terry Rice (born 1954), Arkansas State Senate
Thomas Rice (1734) (1734–1812), Massachusetts State Senate